Niko Paech (born December 9, 1960) is a German economist. Since 2018, he has worked as a supernumerary ("außerplanmäßiger") professor at the University of Siegen. From 2010 to 2018, he was substitute professor at the chair of production and environment (PUM) at the University of Oldenburg. His research focuses on the fields of environmental economics, ecological economics and sustainability.

Biography 
Paech was born in Schüttorf, Germany. He gained a diploma in economics in 1987 from the University of Osnabrück, where he continued to work until 1997, obtaining his PhD in 1993.

After working for a short period as a consultant in the organic food sector and as the Agenda 21 representative of the city Oldenburg, Paech took a position at the University of Oldenburg.

He was co-funder of CENTOS (Oldenburg Center for Sustainability Economics and Management) and is co-chairman of the Vereinigung für Ökologische Ökonomie (VÖÖ), a German ecological economics association, and a member of ZENARIO (Center for sustainable space developing Oldenburg) and the network KoBE e.V. (Expertise center for Building and Energy). In addition, Paech is a member of and scientific adviser for attac-Germany and a founding member of the "Postfossil-Institut" (2011).

In 2006, he was awarded the Kapp Research Award for Ecological Economics for his work on "Sustainable business models beyond innovation and growth – a company-oriented theory of transformation". In 2014, he received the award "Mut zur Nachhaltigkeit" ("Standing up for Sustainability") from the magazine Zeit Wissen. The jury recognised Paech's contribution as a leading light in the worldwide post-growth debate. In an article published in the Guardian about the German post growth movement, he was characterized as "one of the more high-profile members of the movement".

Post-growth economy 
The post-growth economy Paech proposes is one that meets human needs independently of economic growth and which is characterized by degrowth. Post-growth economics intentionally distances itself from popular terms such as "sustainable", "green", "dematerialized" or "decarbonized", rejecting the idea that ecological sustainability can realistically be achieved through technological development alone within a system that continues to measure progress merely in terms of added economic value. Paech argues that it is necessary to overcome growth imperatives and to bring about a new economic order by acknowledging the failure of efforts to decouple environmental destruction and the consumption of resources from economic added value, addressing the need to raise overall well-being in society based on happiness economics, and recognising economic limitations such as global maximum oil output.

His approach is based upon five pillars: institutional innovations, material zero sum games, regional economics, subsistence economy and sufficiency, "which conclusivly leads to higher individual quality of life and promotes the common good." He stresses that there are no sustainable products or sustainable technologies as such, only sustainable lifestyles.

Public perception 
Niko Paech's ideas and proposals have featured in German national newspapers such as the Süddeutsche, Bild, Zeit, taz, Le Monde diplomatique, Tagesspiegel, Badische Zeitung and  VDI nachrichten. He has been interviewed on Deutschlandradio Kultur 3sat, Arte and has been an in-studio guest on the German TV show Planet Wissen. Internationally, his ideas have been discussed in the Austrian Südwind Magazin, the magazine Format and on the ORF, as well as on the Swiss radio station Radio Stadtfilter and in the Italian newspapers La Stampa and Panorama.

Literature

by Paech
Niko Paech: Se libérer du superflu - vers une économie de post-croissance, éd. Rue de l'échiquier, Paris, 2017 
Niko Paech: Liberation from Excess - The road to a post-growth economy. oekom verlag, Munich 2012. 
Niko Paech: Vom grünen Wachstum zur Postwachstumsökonomie. Warum weiteres wirtschaftliches Wachstum keine zukunftsfähige Option ist In: Woynowski, Boris et al. 2012 (Hg.): Wirtschaft ohne Wachstum?! Notwendigkeit und Ansätze einer Wachstumswende.  free access, 20 MB
Niko Paech: Nachhaltiges Wirtschaften jenseits von Innovationsorientierung und Wachstum. Eine unternehmensbezogene Transformationstheorie. Metropolis-Verlag, Marburg 2005.

About Paech's approaches
 Felix Wilmsen: Ignorant und verharmlosend. Dem Postwachstumsspektrum fehlt ein antifaschistischer Konsens - die politische Rechte weiß das zu nutzen. (Ignorant and trivialising: the post-growth community lacks an anti-fascist consensus and the political right knows how to take advantage, in German) analyse & kritik 655. December 10, 2019.

References

External links 

Vita on the homepage of the University of Oldenburg
German Website of Werner Onken and Niko Paech to the post growth economy
lecture of Niko Paech 2011 in Bad Boll (Audioclip 25 minutes; MP3; 28,3 MB)
„Do i look like a hippie?“ Interview with the Tagesspiegel
Im Gespräch mit...Niko Paech (German interview with Martin Burckhardt on Ex nihilo)

1960 births
Living people
20th-century  German economists
21st-century  German economists
Degrowth advocates
Ecological economists
Environmental economists
Regional economists
Academic staff of the University of Oldenburg